Bridget Smith is an American politician. She serves as a Democratic member of the Montana House of Representatives for District 31.

She attended Los Angeles Pierce School and currently lives in Wolf Point, Montana.

References

Living people
People from Wolf Point, Montana
Women state legislators in Montana
Democratic Party members of the Montana House of Representatives
Year of birth missing (living people)
21st-century American politicians
21st-century American women politicians